Nucras broadleyi, also known as the Angolan sandveld lizard, is a wall lizard in the family of true lizards (Lacertidae). It is found in Angola.

References 

Endemic fauna of Angola
Nucras
Lacertid lizards of Africa
Reptiles described in 2019